"I Feel So" is the debut single released by Box Car Racer from their eponymous album. The single peaked at number eight on the Billboard Modern Rock Tracks chart.

Background
An instrumental version of "I Feel So" is present on  the cassette edition of the Box Car Racer album, replacing the last track, “Instrumental”.

Music video
The music video for the song features scenes switching between the band playing in what appears to be a basement with "Box Car Racer" written in graffiti on the wall, along with the track titles of all the songs on the eponymous album, and two children (a boy and a girl) asleep in their bedrooms. The storyline was inspired by the "Muncie, Indiana" scene of the Spielberg science fiction film Close Encounters of the Third Kind (where the boy awakens in the night and his toys start operating on their own). The boy's possessions start to shake as the first chorus starts and the young girl's eyes water as she takes a rose off of her windowsill and its petals fall off. The video achieved some airplay on MTV, and massive success on MTV2, MuchMusic and Fuse TV. The video was directed by both singer Tom DeLonge and Nathan "Karma" Cox. The clip was filmed on March 21, 2002 at a studio in Burbank, California. The video was later released on the Box Car Racer DVD. The album version of the song is a minute longer than the version used in the music video, due to the guitar intro being removed, but the piano intro is still kept in.

Charts

References

Footnotes

Sources

External links

2002 singles
Songs written by Travis Barker
Songs written by Tom DeLonge
2002 songs
MCA Records singles